Edward Davenport (26 March 1844 – 5 March 1915) was an English first-class cricketer, clergyman and educator.

The son of John Marriott Davenport, he was born at Oxford in March 1844. He was educated at Rugby School, before going up to New College, Oxford. While studying at Oxford, he played first-class cricket for Oxford University on six occasions between 1864–66.  In six matches for Oxford, Davenport scored 315 runs at an average of 39.37. His highest score of 107 came opening the batting against the Marylebone Cricket Club in 1866. He also made a single first-class appearance while at Oxford for Southgate Cricket Club in 1864. After graduating from Oxford, Davenport took holy orders in the Church of England and became a master at Wellington College from 1868. After retiring from his position at the college in 1904, he became the rector of Stoke Talmage, Oxfordshire. Davenport died at Stoke Talmage in March 1915.

References

External links

1844 births
1915 deaths
Cricketers from Oxford
People educated at Rugby School
Alumni of Trinity College, Oxford
English cricketers
Oxford University cricketers
Southgate cricketers
19th-century English Anglican priests
Schoolteachers from Berkshire
20th-century English Anglican priests